Megaesophagus, also known as esophageal dilatation, is a disorder of the esophagus in humans and other mammals, whereby the esophagus becomes abnormally enlarged. Megaesophagus may be caused by any disease which causes the muscles of the esophagus to fail to properly propel food and liquid from the mouth into the stomach (that is, a failure of peristalsis). Food can become lodged in the flaccid esophagus, where it may decay, be regurgitated, or maybe inhaled into the lungs (leading to aspiration pneumonia).

Humans
Megaesophagus may occur secondary to diseases such as achalasia or Chagas disease. Achalasia is caused by a loss of ganglion cells in the myenteric plexus. There is a marked lack of contraction within the muscles involved in peristalsis with a constant contraction of the lower esophageal sphincter.  Dilation of the esophagus results in difficulty swallowing.  Retention of food bolus is also noted.

Other animals

Dogs

Megaesophagus can also be a symptom of the disease myasthenia gravis.  Myasthenia gravis is a neuromuscular disease where the primary symptom is weakness in various body parts of the dog.  However, when myasthenia gravis occurs in older dogs it is thought of as an immune-mediated disease.  Often when myasthenia gravis is diagnosed in older dogs the first symptom the dog may manifest is megaesophagus. 

Myasthenia gravis occurs when acetylcholine receptors (nicotinic acetylcholine receptors) fail to function properly, so that the muscle is not stimulated to contract. There is an invention known as the "bailey chair" that uses the force of gravity to push down liquids and food into the dog's stomach. Usually dogs are known to understand when it's time to eat in their bailey chair, and this helps prevent issues. Bailey chairs can be made and are sold.  Also, a simple chair turned upside down can be successfully used for this purpose.

In two unrelated incidents in Latvia and Australia megaesophagus developed in dogs that had eaten certain brands of dog food; however, no agent that could have caused the disorder has been found in lab tests of the food.

Diagnosis

An important distinction in recognizing megaesophagus is the difference between when a dog regurgitates or vomits. When a dog regurgitates there is usually not as much effort involved as when a dog vomits.  Often when regurgitating, the dog will tip its head down and the liquid and/or food will almost appear to "spill out" of its throat.

One of the primary dangers to a dog with megaesophagus is aspiration pneumonia.  Because the food stays lodged in the throat, it can often be inhaled into the lungs causing aspiration pneumonia.  One way to avoid this is to make sure that every time the dog eats or drinks anything, that the dog sits for at least 10 minutes afterward or is held in a sitting up or begging position.  This disorder has a guarded prognosis, however, a successful management technique is vertical feeding in a Bailey Chair.

Affected breeds 

 Basset Fauve de Bretagne
 Bernese Mountain Dog
 Bichon Frise
 Boston Terrier
 Chihuahua
 Cocker Spaniel
 Dachshund
 English Springer Spaniel
 French Bulldog
 German Shepherd
 Golden Retriever
 Great Dane
 Greyhound
 Irish Setter
 Irish Wolfhound
 Italian Greyhound
 Labrador Retriever
 Miniature Schnauzer
 Newfoundland dog
 Rottweiler
 Shar Pei
 Shih Tzu
 Welsh Corgi
 Welsh Terrier
 Wire Fox Terrier
 Yorkshire Terrier

Cats
Affected breeds:
 American Shorthair
 Persian (cat)
 Siamese (cat)

Horses
Megaesophagus is rare in horses. It is more frequently reported in Friesian horses than in other breeds. Congenital megaesophagus is usually identified when a foal begins to eat solid food from the ground; prior to this, as the foal nurses milk from its mother, the milk passes easily down into the stomach. The most common signs are difficulty swallowing (dysphagia) and inhalational pneumonia.

References

External links 

 Canine megaesophagus

Dog diseases
Esophagus disorders